Khmer films increase popularity tremendously after the success of The Snake Kings Wife. A list of films produced in Cambodia in 1971. From the 24 films listed, 2 films exist today, 6 have been remade, and 16 have not yet been remade:

Highest-grossing 
The ten highest-grossing films at the Cambodian Box Office in 1971:

See also 
1971 in Cambodia

References 
 

1971
Films
Cambodian